Kuan King Lam (born 22 November 1934) is a Malaysian former weightlifter. He competed in the men's light heavyweight event at the 1960 Summer Olympics.

References

External links
 

1934 births
Living people
Malaysian male weightlifters
Olympic weightlifters of Malaya
Weightlifters at the 1960 Summer Olympics
People from Ipoh